Vesicle amine transport protein 1 homolog (T. californica)-like is a protein in humans that is encoded by the VAT1L gene.

In humans, the VAT1L gene is located on chromosome 16 locus q23.1. According to SAGE data, it is expressed mainly in the brain.

References

Further reading 

www.genecards.org/cgi-bin/carddisp.pl?gene=VAT1L
http://www.ensembl.org/Homo_sapiens/geneview?gene=ENSG00000171724

Genes on human chromosome 16